Nabam Atum (born 15 March 1948) is a social activist from Arunachal Pradesh, India. In 2012, he was conferred with Our North East (ONE) India Award by the then Chief Minister of Gujarat, Narendra Modi.

Early life
He served as the chairman of Arunachal Pradesh Public Service ankeshwar

 Other organizations in which he has served include:
     Social welfare and Forest Preservation Association as Chairman.
     Dikrong Multipurpose Co-operative Society as Chairman.
     Arunachal Pradesh Seva Sangh, Dohimukh.
     Ramakrishna Mission Hospital Management Committee, Itanagar as Vice President.
     Vivekanand Kendra Institute of Culture, Arunachal Chapter.
     Arunachal Vikas Parishad as President.
     Nishi Indigenous Faith and Cultural Society as Advisor.
     Donyi-Polo Nydear Namlo.
     Indigenous Faith & Cultural Society of Arunachal Pradesh as President.

References

Indian human rights activists
Activists from Arunachal Pradesh
1948 births
Living people
People from Papum Pare district